Tarek William Saab Halabi (born 10 September 1962) is a Venezuelan politician, lawyer and poet. He is a leader of the Fifth Republic Movement (MVR) party founded by Hugo Chávez, President of Venezuela, who publicly called him "The Revolution's Poet". He was the Governor of Anzoátegui from 2004 to 2012, and a member of the Committee for Justice and Truth since 2013. In December 2014, he was elected "People's Defender", or Ombudsman, by the National Assembly for 2014–2021 term. Saab was appointed as President of the Republican Moral Council of Venezuela by the People's Power in 2015. On 5 August 2017, he was appointed as Prosecutor General of Venezuela by the National Constituent Assembly in substitution of Luisa Ortega Diaz.

Career
Saab began his Law School studies in 1985 in Santa Maria University, but for undisclosed reasons he did not graduated in the regular 5 years (his class was graduated in 1990), and finally he graduated as an Attorney in 1992. after Hugo’s Chavez took office he was a member of the Constituent Assembly that drafted in 1999 the Constitution of the Bolivarian Republic of Venezuela. In 2000, he was elected a member of the Venezuelan National Assembly.

During the coup d'état of April 2002, Saab was imprisoned by security forces after a crowd of protesters had gathered around Saab's home, threatening him and his family. He was held incommunicado for several hours.

While Saab was head of the foreign policy commission of Venezuela's National Assembly in 2002, he was refused an entry visa to the United States. Reuters reported that Saab told local television he had been denied the visa because a U.S. State Department report "identified him as 'an individual linked to international subversion'". According to Venezuela's El Universal, Saab said he been denied the visa because of alleged ties with international terrorist organizations, which he denied any association with. Saab is of Lebanese Druze ancestry and is an outspoken critic of Israel.

Governor of Anzoátegui
 
Saab was elected Governor of Anzoátegui in the 2004 regional elections, and re-elected in 2008.

In 2005 Saab was accused by critics within his own party (MVR) of participating in electoral fraud in the primary elections for 2005 local elections. His predecessor as governor of Anzoátegui, David de Lima, accused Saab of using his position for political persecution, after Saab's wife accused De Lima of mismanagement.

Ombudsman
Saab was elected to the post of ombudsman (Defensor del Pueblo) in 2014 by the parliament, for a term of 7 years, with opposition considering the election unlawful for procedural grounds despite the opinion of the Supreme Court. During the 2014–2017 Venezuelan protests, Saab was criticized for allegedly siding with the government on human rights issues, with The Washington Post stating that he "is viewed as an apologist for the unpopular government of President Nicolás Maduro".

Prosecutor General
Saab was appointed Prosecutor General on 5 August 2017 by the National Constituent Assembly after former Prosecutor General Luisa Ortega Díaz was removed from office by the Bolivarian government for allegedly being part of the "counterrevolution". This occurred months after Saab stated himself that he had "no gut, no encouragement, no willingness to be Attorney General" and that he wanted to be Prosecutor "not yesterday, not today, not tomorrow".

OHCHR also noted that in August 2017, the Attorney General dismissed several members of the Directorate for the Protection of Fundamental Rights of the Public Prosecutor's Office, whose role is to investigate human rights violations committed by the security forces. The attorney general dismantled the Criminalistic Unit Against the Violation of Fundamental Rights, created in 2014 to collect forensic evidence in cases where members of the security forces were accused of human rights violations; the director of this unit and several of its forensic experts reportedly fled the country after receiving death threats, according to the report. As a result of the above, the Public Prosecutor's Office has reportedly lost its capacity to conduct independent forensic examinations in cases of human rights violations committed by members of state security.

On 14 June 2018, the National Constituent Assembly appointed William Saab as president of the Truth Commission, considering the appointment of the constituent Delcy Rodríguez as Venezuela's Vice-President.

On 22 June 2018, the Office of the United Nations High Commissioner for Human Rights (OHCHR) published a report entitled Human Rights Violations in the Bolivarian Republic of Venezuela: A Downward Spiral That Seems to Have No End, in which it noted that since William Saab was appointed Attorney General in August 2017, investigations against security personnel for the commission of crimes against humanity had decreased. In the report, the OHCHR noted that the new internal policy within the Public Prosecutor's Office under William Saab was that any investigation related to a security agent had to be personally approved by the attorney general, which had a negative impact on the independence of prosecutors. The report also reads that in some cases, prosecutors were dismissed or removed from cases, as was the case with the prosecutor investigating the death of Rubén González, allegedly killed by a Bolivarian National Guard (GNB) bullet on 10 July 2017, who was removed from the case when she was about to question the GNB officers allegedly involved in the killing.

On 2 February 2023, officers of the National Bolivarian Police of Nueva Esparta state arrested Edgar Alexander Guzmán Granadino and Luis Aquiles Rojas Velásquez, subjects implicated in an assassination attempt on several high-ranking officials of the Public Prosecutor's Office (MP), including Tarek William Saab, whose foiled attempt had been ordered by Jhonatan Marín, a former mayor of Guanta municipality, accused of corruption in Venezuela and convicted of bribery in the United States.

Sanctions 
Tarek William Saab has been sanctioned by several countries and is banned from entering neighboring Colombia. The Colombian government maintains a list of people banned from entering Colombia or subject to expulsion; as of January 2019, the list had 200 people with a "close relationship and support for the Nicolás Maduro regime".

In July 2017, thirteen senior officials of the Venezuelan government, including Saab, associated with the 2017 Venezuelan Constituent Assembly elections were sanctioned by the United States for their role in undermining democracy and human rights.

Canada sanctioned 40 Venezuelan officials, including Saab, in September 2017. The sanctions were for behaviors that undermined democracy after at least 125 people were killed in the 2017 Venezuelan protests and "in response to the government of Venezuela's deepening descent into dictatorship". Canadians were banned from transactions with the 40 individuals, whose Canadian assets were frozen.

The European Union sanctioned seven Venezuela officials, including Saab, on 18 January 2018, singling them out as being responsible for deteriorating democracy in the country. The sanctioned individuals were prohibited from entering the nations of the European Union, and their assets were frozen.

In March 2018, Panama sanctioned 55 public officials, including Saab, and Switzerland implemented sanctions, freezing the assets of seven ministers and high officials, including Saab, due to human rights violations and deteriorating rule of law and democracy.

On 20 April 2018, the Mexican Senate froze the assets of officials of the Maduro administration, including Saab, and prohibited them from entering Mexico.

Literary work
Tarek began writing poetry at the age of fourteen, when he studied at the Liceo Briceño Méndez in El Tigre, Anzoátegui, publishing poems in the Antorcha newspaper of that city. In the 1980s, his poems reached the pages of Papel Literario de El Nacional. The influence of the American poets of the beat generation such as Jack Kerouac, Allen Ginsberg and the hippie counterculture movement were influential in the beginnings of Tarek William Saab's poetry, as were his readings of the German novelist Herman Hesse.

In 1993 he was selected by a jury to represent Venezuela at the "Foro Literatura y Compromiso" (Literature and Commitment Forum) held in Mollina/Malaga (Spain).

His book "Los Niños del Infortunio" was written after he was invited by Cuban President Fidel Castro, during an interview in Havana in 2005, to visit the Cuban medical mission in Pakistan. It was presented at the Cuban capital's book fair the following year, in the presence of Castro and Hugo Chávez. Chávez dubbed him El Poeta de la Revolución (The Poet of the Revolution).

Books 
Saab has written numerous publications, including Los ríos de la Ira (1987), El Hacha de los Santos (1992), Príncipe de Lluvia y Duelo (1992), Al Fatah (México, 1994), Angel Caído Angel (1998), Cielo a Media Asta (2003), Cuando Pasen las Carretas (2003), Poemas selectos (Colombia, 2005), Los niños del infortunio (Cuba, 2006. China, 2007), Memorias de Gulan Rubani (Caracas, 2007), Un paisaje boreal (Valencia, 2008. Caracas, 2009), Hoguera de una adolescencia intemporal (Caracas, 2022).

Notes

External links

Anzoátegui State Governor Election, 2004 Results, cne.gob.ve; accessed 7 July 2015.

1962 births
21st-century Venezuelan poets
Fifth Republic Movement politicians
Governors of Anzoátegui
Living people
Members of the National Assembly (Venezuela)
Ombudsmen
People from El Tigre
United Socialist Party of Venezuela politicians
20th-century Venezuelan lawyers
Venezuelan male poets
Universidad Santa María (Venezuela) alumni
People of the Crisis in Venezuela
Venezuelan people of Lebanese descent
Venezuelan Buddhists
Members of the Venezuelan Constituent Assembly of 1999